Firuzi (also Romanized as Fīrūzī; also known as Firoozi Marvdasht and Fīrūzī-ye Marvdasht) is a village in Kenareh Rural District, in the Central District of Marvdasht County, Fars Province, Iran. At the 2006 census, its population was 2,639, in 699 families.

References 

Populated places in Marvdasht County